Amit Agarwal (born 17 January 1955) is an Indian politician. He is Member of the Uttar Pradesh Legislative Assembly from the Meerut Cantonment Assembly constituency representing the largest party of Uttar Pradesh, Bharatiya Janata Party. He is known to be the richest MLA candidate in 2022 Uttar Pradesh Legislative Assembly election.

References 

Living people
Uttar Pradesh MLAs 2022–2027
Bharatiya Janata Party politicians from Uttar Pradesh
People from Meerut district
Uttar Pradesh MLAs 1993–1996
Uttar Pradesh MLAs 1997–2002
1955 births